Cancer Informatics is a peer-reviewed open access medical journal focusing on the application of computational biology to cancer research. It was established in 2005 and was originally published by Libertas Academica. SAGE Publications became the publisher in September 2016. The editor in chief is J. T. Efird.

Abstracting and indexing 
The journal is abstracted and indexed in:

References

External links
 

Publications established in 2005
Oncology journals
English-language journals
SAGE Publishing academic journals
Open access journals